Bayazid Bostami is a thana of Chattogram District in Chattogram Division, Bangladesh. There are three wards in the Thana.

History
This thana is named after the Persian Sufi Bayazid Bostami one of whose shrine is located under this thana. It was established on 27 May in 2000.

Geography 

Demographics 
According to the 2011 census, population of this thana is 211,355.
Density of population is 12,022.5/km2.

See also 
 Upazilas of Bangladesh
 Districts of Bangladesh
 Divisions of Bangladesh

References 

Thanas of Chittagong District